Above the Great City is the debut EP by American metal band My Ticket Home. It was released independently on May 23, 2009.

Track listing

Personnel
My Ticket Home
 Nick Giumenti – unclean vocals
 Nick Salemi – keyboards, clean vocals
 Sean Mackowski – guitars
 Matt Seidel – guitars
 Luke Fletcher - bass
 Marshal Giumenti – drums

Production
 Bobby Leonard – production, engineered, mastering, mixing

References

2009 debut EPs
My Ticket Home albums